Cheoeum(-)cheoreom, also known as Chum(-)churum is a Korean word that comes from Cheoeum (literally the first) and Cheoreom (literally like), and means like the first time. It may also refer to:

 Cheoeumcheoreom, a collection of essay by Shin Young-bok
 Chum-Churum, soju in South Korea, stem from aforesaid collection of essay Cheoeumcheoreom
 Cheoeumcheoreom, a song of debut studio album by T-ara
 Cheoeumcheoreom, a song of debut album of the same name by Sung Si-kyung
 Cheoeumcheoreom, a soundtrack of Romance Zero by Lee Tae-sung
 Cheoeumcheoreom, a soundtrack of I Do, I Do by Tae-yeon

See also 
 arche